Formed in 1956, the Australian Speleological Federation Inc. (ASF) is the national body representing those interested in the protection and sustainability of Australia's cave and karst environments. It has approximately 850 members across 28 constituent bodies throughout all Australian states and territories.

The ASF represents Australia within the International Union of Speleology, which is linked with UNESCO.

The federation is registered as an environmental organisation by the Department of the Environment and Energy, Canberra. The ASF maintains a public fund, authorised under the Income Tax Assessment Act 1997 item 6.1.1, subsection 30–55(1) to receive tax-deductible donations for its environmental purposes.

ASF works in environmental protection.  Many members have largely recreational interests but have joined the federation to support its environmental objectives; others have primarily management, historical, scientific or academic interests in caves and karst.  In all cases the federation's policies and guidelines influence the environmental practices of all cave users i.e. managers, recreational cavers, tourists, scientists and adventurous visitors.  Throughout Australia, codes developed by ASF, e.g. Ethics, Minimum Impact, Cave Classification, Documentation, Cave Diving and Safety have been incorporated in land management plans both for caves and for broader karst parks.

ASF publishes Helictite: Journal of Australasian Speleological Research.  One of only four or five such refereed scientific journals in the world, this publication has improved understanding of caves and karst, and in turn the standard of interpretation provided to the public by guides and rangers.

Constitutional aims 
"To safeguard and protect the natural environment, specifically the cave and karst environment of Australia"
"To gather and disseminate information, develop and promote policies, foster and publish research, and provide education and advice to the Australian community on conserving Australia's karst resources."
To bring together and represent persons interested in caves and karst in Australia and the attainment of the Federation's aims"
To foster speleology in all of its aspects"

Environmental objective
"To promote conservation and sustainable management of Australia's caves and karst"

ASF's contribution to cave and karst protection
ASF has contributed to protection of the cave and karst environment by:
Consulting on environmental management issues to Commonwealth, New South Wales, Tasmanian, Victorian, South Australia, Western Australia and Northern Territory government instrumentalities;
Publishing a respected, biennial peer-refereed journal reporting scientific research (Helictite)
Developing an electronic database of over 10,000 cave and karst features in Australia;
Cooperating with or lobbying other bodies for better educational and conservation practices e.g. Australian Geological Survey Organisation, Australian Army, Karst & Geodiversity Unit.
Through its tax-deductible public fund and occasional government grants e.g. from the Natural Heritage Trust, ASF conducts programs and projects to raise community awareness of karst-related environmental issues, especially those of national or regional significance.  ASF does not receive any ongoing public funding, and has no paid staff and the members act in a purely voluntary capacity. In addition, by the same means and by persuasion and example it encourages member societies and individuals to undertake practical cave conservation and protection measures in co-operation with owners and managers.

ASF and members played a leading role in environmental issues relating to caves and karst at Colong, Bungonia and Yessabah (NSW), Gordon-Franklin, Precipitous Bluff, Exit Cave and Mt Cripps (Tas) Mount Etna (Qld), The Potholes (Vic) and Sellicks Hill (SA).  ASF took court action objecting to mining exploration at Cape Range (WA) and Mt Cripps (Tas) and Timor, NSW.  As well, ASF was retained as consultant on specific management strategy issues at Jenolan (NSW), Nullarbor Plain (SA/WA), Yallingup (WA), Hastings Cave and Exit Cave (Tas), Cutta Cutta (NT), and elsewhere.

Recent environmental issues 
In the last few years ASF has:
Formally conducted objections in Mining Warden Courts to mining leases at Cape Range (WA), Mt Cripps (Tas)
Made submissions to land managers on karst environmental issues at Yanchep National Park (WA), Borenore Caves (NSW), Jenolan Caves (NSW), Hastings Caves (Tas), Mt Field National Park (Tas), Regional Forest Agreement process (Tas), Cooleman (NSW).
Fenced off remnants of karst vegetation (Cliefden NSW; Canobla, NSW)
Conducted a rural community workshop on karst on private landholdings (Stuart Town)
Been an invited participant at an IUCN seminar on limestone quarrying (Bathurst, NSW)
Contributed to an educational kit published by the Australian Geological Survey Organisation
Persuaded the Australian Army adventure training school to rewrite its training manual to include a conservation policy supplied by ASF (Hobart and Kapooka)
Co-sponsored Limestone Coast – First International Workshop on Ramsar Subterranean Wetlands, Naracoorte Caves World Heritage Area 2004
Initiated dialogue with the aboriginal community, including hosting a training session relating to recognition and conservation of indigenous sites on karst and in caves
Provided funding for an appeal to the NSW Land and Environment Court relating to a limestone quarry approval near Timor Caves, NSW
Organised the 14th International Symposium and field trips on Vulcanospeleology for the International Union of Speleology (UIS) Commission on Volcanic Caves, 2010

Special interest groups

Cave Diving Group

The Australian Speleological Federation Cave Diving Group (ASF-CDG) organises cave diving exploration across the Australian continent bring together cave divers from ASF state clubs. The ASF-CDG impresses upon trip leaders to bring the ethics of environmentalism to cave diving, promote science, mapping and safe exploration.

Community and statutory recognition

A measure of the high regard and respect held for ASF and organised speleology generally in Australia is the federation's representation on advisory boards and committees throughout the country. ASF had statutory representation on the old Board of Jenolan Caves Reserve Trust (NSW) and its Speleological Advisory Committee, and on the Karst Management Advisory Committee of DECC.

Seven ASF members have received awards in the Order of Australia honours list (OAM and AM), specifically citing their contribution to knowledge and conservation of cave environments. Another was runner-up in the BHP Environmentalist of the Year award, and yet another received a Rolex award for excellence in conservation.

See also
 Newcastle and Hunter Valley Speleological Society (NHVSS)
 Sydney Speleological Society (SSS)
 Sydney University Speleological Society (SUSS)
 Victorian Speleological Association (VSA)

Publications

References

External links
 
 Helictite journal page

Further reading
 Watson, J. R. Australian Conference on Cave Tourism and Management (4th: 1981: Yallingup) Proceedings of the fourth Australian Conference on Cave Tourism and Management: Yallingup, Western Australia, September 1981. hosted jointly by Busselton Tourist Bureau and Australian Speleological Federation. Perth:National Parks Authority, Western Australia and The Federation. Series: Cave management in Australia, 0159-54 15; 4.

Environmental organisations based in Australia
Caving organizations
1956 establishments in Australia
Caving in Australia